Daughters of the Moon is a novel series by Lynne Ewing. It is about four fictional girls, later five, who are mortal goddesses and who fight an ancient evil called The Atrox. They each have different powers, destinies, and dark sides. They all wear moon amulets. When they turn 17, they have to make a choice. They can either become something more or continue their lives – but as mortals who have forgotten their lives and consequently, their powers, as Daughters of the Moon. All of the Daughters live in Los Angeles, battling the Atrox and its dark Followers. Sons of the Dark is a companion series.

Series description
"Vanessa, Catty, Serena, and Jimena seem like ordinary girls living in Los Angeles. But they each have a secret. Vanessa can become invisible, Catty travels back in time, Serena reads minds, and Jimena has premonitions. What separates them from others bands them together as Daughters of the Moon."

Second description after 6th book, The Lost One
"Vanessa, Serena, Jimena, Catty and Tianna are five seemingly ordinary girls from Los Angeles. But the truth is that they are all far from ordinary. They each have a secret power that separates them from others - and makes them Daughters of the Moon."

Characters

Vanessa Cleveland

A blonde Daughter of the Moon and Daughter of Pandora, who stars in Goddess of the Night (Book #1), Moon Demon (Book #7) where she finds out that she started to fall in love with what Jimena's grandmother called the devil, and The Final Eclipse (Book #13).  As a Daughter of the Moon, she is able to expand her molecules and become invisible. Occasionally, she can move objects while she is invisible, but it takes a lot of concentration. Originally, Vanessa was cautious about using her power, which caused her to have very poor control over it. However, throughout the series, she becomes more comfortable using it although she is still affected by strong emotions, such as fear. She lives with her mother, a Hollywood costume designer. Her father was a stunt coordinator who died when she was five in an accident. Vanessa is portrayed as being intelligent and always trying to see the best of people, such as Morgan Page who is consistently rude to Vanessa's other friends. Her best friend is Catty Turner, whom she has known since they were both children. She dates Michael Saratoga on and off throughout the series. In book 4, she starts to date Toby, a Regulator, who wants the Secret Scroll destroyed but he endangers all of the girls, including Vanessa. Fortunately, he is ultimately killed in the end. In book 7, Vanessa starts to date a mysterious guy named Hector, who later turns out to be a moon demon. He tries to marry her so she can live with him for eternity, but she frees him from his bonds to the Atrox, causing his death. In the same book, Vanessa reveals a talent for singing and joins Michael's band. Also her birthday is revealed to be November 14. In book 13, Vanessa returns from Nefandus after being held prisoner there for many months and discovers her 17th birthday is a few days away. After she helps to defeat the Atrox she is faced with the choice of becoming a guardian spirit or losing her memories of what she is and her powers. She makes the choice of losing her memories and her powers.

Serena Killingsworth
Serena has long dark hair with red tips in the beginning of the series then she goes her natural dark brown. She has green eyes, and 3 piercings; one in her tongue, one in her nose, and one in her belly button. She is a Daughter of both Selene and Hekate resulting in her being a goddess of the moon and a goddess of the dark. She lives with her brother, Collin Killingsworth. Her best friend is Jimena, a fellow goddess. She stars in Into the Cold Fire (Book #2), and Possession (Book #8). She is the only Daughter to have the choice to become a goddess of the dark because she is the key to the balance of good or evil. She has the ability to read and cloud minds, powers similar to the Atrox's. She also has the ability to open and close portals. Serena continues to pursue an on and off relationship with Stanton, a Follower of the Atrox who later becomes the Prince of Night. Stanton is constantly worried because being with Serena can get them both killed by the Regulators. In the end, after she helps to defeat the Atrox, Serena has to make the choice of losing her memories of what she is and her powers, becoming a guardian spirit, or becoming the goddess of the dark. Stanton asks Serena to rule by his side and become the goddess of the dark and she accepts his offer. She stays in Nefandus with Stanton to make it a world of light.

Jimena Castillo

Daughter of the Moon and former member of an LA gang. She is Mexican and holds the power of premonition, seeing into the future. She lives with her grandmother in an apartment. Jimena used to be an incredibly tough hood chick with her gang from her neighborhood, Ninth Street, or el Nueve until she learned of her destiny. Her old gang name Risky is tattooed on her hip. She was sentenced to Youth Camp twice and has two teardrops mark tattoos, one for each time she stayed at camp. She also has three dots on the webbing of her thumb from when she joined her gang. Later in the series, Jimena has Catty give her another tattoo of a moon and star on her arm. After facing Followers together and seeing that Serena would always have her back, she and Jimena become best friends. In book 3 she begins dating Collin Killingsworth, Serena's older brother. As the series goes on, it is revealed that Jimena is actually a year older than her friends, so she is forced to be the first to make the choice of losing her memories of what she is and her powers, or becoming a guardian spirit. Eventually, she chooses to stay mortal because she both saw a premonition of her death and realized how much of the world she had yet to experience. Maggie, the Daughters' mentor, explains that Jimena's premonition was not of her death, but of the end of her time as a Daughter. On her last day as a Daughter, she was given the Medusa stone to protect her from enchantment and evil spirits. She then becomes a mortal and completely forgets her life as a Daughter. However, later in the series, it is established that she is the reincarnation of the moon goddess Pandia who was Maggie's and the other early daughters' mentor. She now serves as the new mentor for her friends after Maggie's death and to other future daughters. Jimena who is now still friends with Vanessa even though she has lost complete mysteries with Jimena and her powers she once had.

Catty Turner

Daughter of the Moon and heiress to the Secret Scroll, starring in The Secret Scroll (Book #4) and The Prophecy (Book #11). Catty has the power to travel back and forth through time (chronokinesis). She was abandoned by her birth mother, Zoe Reese, who was a Daughter of the Moon with the powers of telekinesis. She was picked up by Kendra Turner on the side of the road. Kendra originally thought because of Catty's power, that Catty was an alien so she adopted her as her own, to protect her. Kendra is very relax with Catty and does not mind when Catty misses class in order to "hop" time. Catty's best friend is Vanessa and unlike her, she is not shy about using her power. Much to Vanessa's chagrin, Catty often uses it in public places and does not care about how her time hops affect people. Unlike Vanessa who tries to be cautious and cool, Catty is often wild and impulsive.

An ambition of Catty's is to find her biological mother and she manages to do so in The Secret Scroll. There, she finds out that her mother became Follower of the Atrox and that her biological father is a member of the Atrox's inner circle. Later, it is revealed that Catty's birth name is Atertra Adamantis, which means "black diamond". From her mother, Catty inherits the Secret Scroll and finds it is her destiny to destroy the Atrox with it. Chris (also known as Chriysippus), the Keeper of the Secret Scroll and Catty's ex-boyfriend, helps her find the Scroll but almost loses his life, because it was intertwined with the scroll which Catty ultimately destroys in one of the later books.

In Prophecy, Catty meets her father who offers her a place with the Atrox. She declines. She also begins to date, Kyle Ormond, who was once enslaved in Nefandus. By the Barbarian (Sons of the Dark !), they had broken up cause Catty discovers that their destinies are intertwined. She is spared by the Atrox after Tianna rebinds it to its shadow cause her father convinced the Atrox that Catty would join them. Catty accepts and gains new powers from her father and the Atrox, much to the shock of her friends but is revealed she is actually planning to destroy the Atrox from the inside. She lies to the Atrox and pretends to have captured the Sons of the Dark, gaining a place in the Inner Circle. She ultimately succeeds in destroying the Atrox but sacrifices her life in the process.

Tianna Moore

A girl with the powers of telekinesis who can also use that power to go into other dimensions, she first shows up in The Lost One (Book #6) and in The Becoming (Book #12). She becomes a Daughter of the Moon after she helps Catty get out of Nefandus, the realm of the Atrox. When she first shows up in The Lost One, she has no memory of who she is or where she came from. Ultimately, she pieces together the facts: she grew up in foster homes all over LA because her parents and little sister, Jamie, were killed by Followers when she was a child. She also begins to date a boy named Derek who knows the Daughters' secrets. Their relationship lasts until The Becoming. The foster mother she lives with is discovered to be a failed creation by the Atrox. Tianna was created by the Atrox and thus was born without a soul, but Selene kidnapped her when she was a baby and gave her to a Daughter. Her mother gave her moon dew also known as honeysuckle so that Tianna would have a soul and become as human as possible. Her evil destiny is to become the wife of the Atrox and give birth to its child. Her good destiny, created with the help of Selene and her mother, is to rebind the Atrox to its shadow. In book 12, Tianna re-binds the Atrox, which was in its most powerful form as a human, to its shadow form. In doing so, she destroys herself. Before the Atrox could get her soul, Selene saves her soul.

Stanton

An L.A. Follower who becomes the Prince of the Night who stars in the book The Sacrifice (Book #5). He was an invitus, someone who unwillingly came to the Atrox in the 13th Century. His father, a prince, was hunting the Atrox, leaving Stanton at home. Unfortunately, while the prince was away, the Atrox took Stanton to scare his father from ever attempting to destroy it again. In Goddess of the Night (Book #1), he shows Vanessa his memory of his kidnapping. In his memory, she attempts to free him and for that act of kindness, he can never hurt her. He is in love with Serena, even though their love for each other is forbidden. In The Sacrifice, he becomes free as a Follower at last, but chooses to go back to the Atrox in order to save Serena. In doing this, he is able to trap Lambert in his memory, and is awarded the status of Prince of the Night. With that status, he can order the Regulators not to hurt Serena and occasionally, her friends. He helps the Daughters throughout the series because of his devotion to Serena. He gave Tianna the sword to bind the Atrox to its shadow, helped in the disguise of monk so that Kyle escape, and visited Serena and Vanessa while they were held captive in Nefandus. Stanton helps Vanessa and Catty destroy the Atrox and save Serena. After the Atrox is destroyed, he becomes the new leader in Nefandus with Serena by his side. He also helped Vanessa in  the 7th book by warning her about Hector and sending her a protector/follower that looked like Michael.

Maggie Craven

She was the Daughters' mentor and taught them how to control their respective powers. In The Talisman (Book #10), we find more about her past. Maggie was born in Athens, Greece as Penelope. She is an illegitimate child of Zeus and grew up with her adoptive father and sister, Taemestra. As Penelope grew devoted to Selene, her sister became a follower of the Atrox. She fell in love with a young, handsome soldier named Hector, who later became captured by the Atrox and became the moon demon who tried to marry Vanessa in book 7. Maggie managed to bind the Atrox to its shadow form for the first time, Tianna being the second. Also near the end of The Talisman, Maggie discovers she is pregnant with Hectors child.

Angered by her sister's choice and Hector's transformation, she asked Selene to live long enough to see the Atrox destroyed. However, before Selene could grant her wish, the Atrox overheard and granted it. Unfortunately for Maggie, she had forgotten to ask for perpetual youth, but Selene gave her an elixir that would keep her young. When the Atrox visited her, she said an incantation to destroy it but it backfired to destroy her instead, as it was not her destiny to destroy the Atrox. Before she can warn the Daughters and contact Jimena, who is the next mentor to the Daughters, her body is destroyed by the incantation and her soul moves on.

Atrox

The Atrox is the enemy of The Daughters of the Moon. It wants to unleash diseases, terror and other horrible things. But to unleash these terrible things it must destroy the Daughters of the Moon. It created Tianna Moore, and protected Vanessa Cleveland. It took the form of a human male named Ethan. In the End the Atrox ends up being defeated by Catty Turner.

Minor characters

Morgan Page
Morgan is introduced in "Goddess of the Night" as a wealthy, narrow-minded, and snobbish socialite friend of Vanessa's. Catty, Jimena, and Serena dislike her, mostly due to the fact that her mind seems encompassed around nothing but boys and clothes although Vanessa once noticed that Morgan is deliberately trying to be care free to cover up her own insecurities. However, she is snide and rude, criticizing Serena Killingsworth, on her unique fashion sense although Serena once penetrated her mind and saw that Morgan was jealous of Serena's talent on the cello.  She meets Stanton at Planet Bang, and begins dating him, unaware of his status as a Follower. He and the other Followers ultimately steals her hope, and Vanessa brings her to Maggie Craven, the mentor of the Daughters, who restores Morgan's dwindling hope.

Morgan, normal once more and just as cold-hearted, pursues Collin Killingsworth, Serena's older brother, in "Into the Cold Fire". Serena enacts vengeance on Morgan for criticizing her [Serena] behind her back, by manipulating Morgan's thought during a pep rally speech. Morgan delivers a humorous, off the topic speech about how she stuffed her bra during a party. Enraged and somehow knowing Serena was behind it, she confronts Serena. Later on, they stumble into each other, and in the end of the book, is seen fleeing with Followers, implying she is one of them (as Zahi, an Immortal Follower, had been courting her, too).

In Night Shade, Morgan is a part of a scheme by Cassandra in which she, Morgan, and Karyl plot to destroy the Daughters, focusing mainly on Jimena Castillo. She is the one who lures Veto into placing Jimena in their trap. When everything fails for the three Followers, Cassandra is made an outcast, and nothing is heard of about Morgan and Karyl.

Morgan comes into play once more in Possession. She is fearful of something that the Daughters do not know of, to the point where she purchases a charm to ward off evil. Serena somehow can not access her mind, too. She is later revealed to have been possessed by Aura, and is finally released from this possession after Serena fends off the Infidi (those loyal to Lambert and Aura).

Chris

He was Catty's boyfriend and the keeper of the Secret Scroll. His real name is Chryssipus and is from ancient Greece. He met Maggie on her way to destroy the Atrox and helped her bind it to its shadow. Throughout the centuries, he was the keeper of the secret scroll, which he later gives to Catty. He fell in love with her in The Secret Scroll (Book #4).  He disappears, but comes back to help Jimena in The Choice (Book #9). In The Prophecy (Book #11), he is held prisoner by Catty's father. He tells Catty that his life is bound to the scroll so that when Catty destroys the scroll, he is destroyed as well.

Cassandra

A Follower, she was once madly in love with Stanton. She is described as having long maroon hair and icy blue eyes, and has the letters S-T-A carved into her chest with a razor blade. In the third book, she is given an opportunity to destroy the Daughters and gets into the Inner Circle for a little while. Unfortunately for her, she fails the Atrox and becomes an Outcast. She is seen on and off throughout the books, causing trouble and such, in an attempt to win Stanton.

Kyle Ormond
Kyle is Catty's boyfriend during The Prophecy (Book #11) and The Becoming (Book #12). He is first described as a gorgeous high school boy who attracts girls despite his reputation as a magnet for trouble. It is later revealed that he is a servus, a slave in Nefandus. As a servus, Kyle has the ability to read minds. He is also under a curse that forces him to kill any non-resident of Nefandus that he tries to kiss by slowly absorbing her power. He first stepped into Nefandus to save a friend who had been lured into the realm with promises of learning magic, only to become captured and enslaved himself. Kyle escaped with the help of a monk (Stanton in disguise) who showed him the portals and told him the myth of a black diamond that could set him free. In pursuit of this jewel and his freedom, he is tricked by Adamantis into bringing Catty into Nefandus, inadvertently putting her in danger. Realizing his mistake, he eventually saves Catty and the two begin a relationship after Catty accepts her evil heritage. In The Final Eclipse (Book #13), Kyle sacrifices his life so that Catty could infiltrate the Inner Circle and destroy the Atrox.

Justin and Mason

They are two Followers who killed Tianna's parents and sister. They went back in time to kill Tianna, not aware that she was created by the Atrox. In book 12, they become Outcasts and want Tianna to go to the Atrox to ask it to let them back in.

Hector

Maggie's old lover. He fell in love with Maggie and wanted to marry her, but she could not accept because she promised herself to Selene until the Atrox was destroyed. As a result, he challenged the Atrox for Maggie, but it tricked him and he became the moon demon. In book 7, the Atrox summons him to destroy the Daughters but he falls in love with Vanessa. He tries to marry her and have her rule with him but in the end, Vanessa frees him and he peacefully dies.

Lambert Malmaris

A member of the Inner Circle and allowed to wear the Phoenix Crest, which makes him very powerful. Lambert first appeared in The Sacrifice (Book #5), where he joined forces with Cassandra to destroy the Atrox and take over. In the end, Stanton destroys his body but he shows up again in Possession (Book #8). Stanton imprisoned him in his memories of the Atrox but Aura, Lambert's lover, possessed Serena to get close to Stanton and use Serena's powers to free Lambert. After Stanton destroyed him in book 5, he becomes a sphere of light that can possess anyone. He is also known as Darius.

Aura Triton

Aura Triton is Lambert's lover. She was born in A.D. 1223 to a peasant father, with a jewel clutched in her hands, which subsequently disappeared. Her fate was thus sealed: all good would slip through her fingers. Aura, known then as Ursula, became renowned for her unearthly beauty, attracting even the Atrox, who offered her father great treasures if she would betroth it. Seeing her father's poverty, Ursula agreed to the marriage and pledged her devotion for all of eternity, asking only that her beauty should last forever. Yet when Lambert, a follower, came to bring her to the underworld, he fell desperately in love with her, and she with him. Despite attempts to hide their love, the Atrox saw through her deception. When she stepped into the cold fire to receive immortality, the flames destroyed her flesh and bones, reducing her to a wind spirit. Using a potion that Lambert procures from the ancient enchantress Circe, she then lives on by possessing other people and switching bodies whenever the one she possesses becomes old. Aura appears in Possession (Book #8), when she begins taking over Serena's body in an attempt to use her powers to free Lambert from Stanton's memories. Other individuals that Aura has possessed include the starlet Ann Anderson and ex-follower Morgan Page.

Tymmie and Karyl

Tymmie and Karyl are two of the first Followers that the Daughters encounter in the series. They were once apprenticed to Stanton but since Stanton's appointment as Prince of the Night, Karyl has not been mentioned. However, Tymmie joins Lambert. In Goddess of the Night he is blond with black roots but in the 7th book he shaves his head and tattoos "Atrox" on it. In book 13, he reunites with Karyl to work for Catty's father.

Adamantis

One of the members of the Inner Circle of the Atrox and Catty's father, he is trying to overthrow the Atrox. Despite being on the same side of the Daughters, he never loved Catty and tried to have Stanton destroyed. Vanessa fights him and defeats him. He leaves Nefandus but it is unknown whether or not he is in Earth's Realm. His goal is to stay with Catty.

Zoe Reese

Zoe is Catty's biological mother and a former Daughter of the Moon with the power of telekinesis. She became frightened of her impending metamorphosis and turned to the Atrox, who promised her the gift of immortality. However, the Atrox sensed that her commitment was made out of fear and tricked her. Zoe had failed to ask for perpetual youth. From the moment she turned immortal, she was condemned to age for all of eternity. She first blamed Maggie for her misfortune but eventually comes to accept that her fate was due to her own lack of courage. As a follower, Zoe falls in love with Adamantis and gives birth to his child Atertra, later known as Catty. In order to protect her daughter from Regulators and from her destiny as heiress to the Secret Scroll, she abandons Catty on the side of a deserted highway after having Stanton remove her childhood memories. She then settles near Catty and watches over her without daring to reveal her presence, for fear that she would put her daughter in danger. Because she has done so much to protect Catty, Selene visits her in her dreams and welcomes her soul, offering her a second chance. Zoe accepts this offer after she has a discussion with Catty and leaves her body behind to become a spirit.

International titles
UK and Canada: The same as the US
France: Les Filles de la Lune
Germany: Magic Friends
Sweden: Måndöttrar

Series, in Order
*Daughters of the Moon & Sons of the Dark: 
01. Goddess of the Night (2000)    
02. Into the Cold Fire (2000)          
03. Night Shade (2001)                  
04. The Secret Scroll (2001)           
05. The Sacrifice (2001)
06. The Lost One (2001)
07. Moon Demon (2002)
08. Possession (2002)
09. The Choice (2003)
10. The Talisman (2003)
11. The Prophecy (2004)
01. Barbarian (2004)
02. Escape (2004)
12. The Becoming (2004)
03. Outcast (2005)
04. Night Sun (2005)
13. The Final Eclipse (2007)

Daughters of the Moon 1 - 3 (omnibus) (2010)
Daughters of the Moon: Volume Two 4 - 6 (omnibus) (2011)

References

External links
Daughters of the Moon Homepage

Fantasy novel series
Young adult novel series
Contemporary fantasy novels
American fantasy novels
American young adult novels
Fiction about invisibility
Novels about time travel